Jong PEC Zwolle (English: Young PEC Zwolle) are the reserve team of PEC Zwolle. The team has competed in the KNVB Reserve Cup.

The youth system is known for having produced some Dutch internationals like Jaap Stam, Bert Konterman and Henk Timmer.

Most of the players in Jong PEC Zwolle play in the highest youth team. Every week, a few players from the first squad appear in the reserve squad.

Staff
Head coach: Claus Boekweg
Teammanager: Jaap Stam
Physio: Arthur Vennik

Youth team

See also
 PEC Zwolle

PEC Zwolle